Fidonisy was the name ship of her class of eight destroyers built for the Imperial Russian Navy during World War I. Originally named Feodonisy, she was renamed Fidonisy before she was completed. Completed in 1917, she played a minor role in the war as part of the Black Sea Fleet before the Russian Revolution began later that year. Her crew joined the Bolsheviks in December and she supported their efforts to assert control in the Crimea over the next several months. The ship sailed from Sevastopol as the Germans approached in May 1918, but was scuttled in Novorossiysk harbor the following month when the Germans demanded that she be handed over as per the terms of the Treaty of Brest-Litovsk. Her wreck was discovered in 1964 and was partially salvaged.

Design and description

Her crew numbered 136 men.

The ships mounted a main armament of four single 102 mm Pattern 1911 Obukhov guns. Anti-aircraft defense for Fidonisy was provided by a pair of  anti-aircraft guns and four  M-1 machine guns. The destroyers mounted four triple  torpedo tube mounts amidships with a pair of reload torpedoes and could carry 80 M1908 naval mines. They were also fitted with a Barr and Stroud rangefinder and two  searchlights.

Construction and service 
The eight Fidonisy-class destroyers were ordered on 17 March 1915 at a cost of 2.2 million rubles each. All of them received names in honor of the victories of Admiral Fyodor Ushakov. The ship that later became Fidonisy was originally named Feodonisy, an alternate spelling of Fidonisy, commemorating the Battle of Fidonisi in 1788 and she received her final name on 9 January 1917. After being added to the Black Sea Fleet ship list on 2 July 1915, Fidonisy was laid down in the Russud Shipyard in Nikolayev on 29 October 1915. The ship was launched on 18 May 1916, completed on 25 May 1917 and was accepted for service on 1 June. Fidonisy participated in a commando raid on the Turkish port of Ordu on 24 August. The following month, she was one of eight destroyers that patrolled off the west Anatolian coast and helped to sink 19 small sailing ships on 13–15 September 1917. Between 30 September and 20 October the ship participated in multiple patrols attempting to interdict the delivery of coal to Istanbul; during this time, the Russian destroyers claimed to have sunk 1 steamship, 23 sailing vessels and captured 2 others. The navy ceased offensive operations against the Central Powers in early November in response to the Bolshevik Decree on Peace before a formal Armistice was signed the next month.

In January 1918 the ship supported Bolshevik efforts to consolidate their power in Yevpatoria and Feodosia, Crimea, and helped to suppress armed resistance in Feodosia and Alushta in April. On 2 May Fidonisy sailed from Feodosia to Novorossiysk to avoid being seized by advancing German forces. On 18 June, the ship was scuttled in Tsemes Bay by torpedoes fired by her sister ship  to avoid being turned over to the Germans in accordance with the terms of the Treaty of Brest-Litovsk. Broken in half, Fidonisys wreck was discovered and partially salvaged in 1964.

References

Bibliography

Further reading

External links

Fidonisy-class destroyers
Ships built at the Black Sea Shipyard
1916 ships